The 1922–23 season was Manchester United's 27th season in the Football League. Having been relegated from the First Division the previous season, they finished the season fourth in the Second Division, just missing out on promotion from the division in which they had not played for nearly 20 years.

Second Division

FA Cup

References

Manchester United F.C. seasons
Manchester United